Beurey-sur-Saulx (literally Beurey on Saulx) is a commune in the Meuse department in the Grand Est region in northeastern France.

On 29 August 1944, the 3rd Panzergenadier Division  of the  German Wehrmacht massacred 86 inhabitants of this and the three neighboring villages of Robert-Espagne, Couvonges and  Mognéville. This is also referred to as the Massacre de la vallée de la Saulx. In Beurey-sur-Saulx, the deputy mayor Mr. Aimé Honoré, Mr. Paul Fenaux and Mr. Eugene Francis were shot in front of their homes.

Charles de Gaulle participated in a memorial service on 28 July 1946. A memorial was inaugurated on August 29, 1949 by General André Zeller, commander of the 6th military region.

Population

See also
Communes of the Meuse department
Massacre de la vallée de la Saulx
 HOMMAGE AUX MARTYRS DE LA VALLÉE DE LA SAULX  des villages de Robert-Espagne - Beurey-sur-Saulx - Couvonges - Mognéville - Trémont-sur-Saulx. (in French)

References

Communes of Meuse (department)
War crimes in France